Jean-Maximin called Simin Palay, (Occitan: Simin Palai), (1874–1965) was a French writer; as a native Béarnese speaker, he wrote poetry and articles in this language. He also made numerous philology studies on Béarnese and gascon languages.

Biography 
Simin Palay was born at Casteide-Doat, on the border between Béarn and Bigorre, on may 29 1874. He died at Gelos on february 22 1965.

Selected bibliography

Poetry
 Bercets dé youénésse è coundes enta rise (1899)
 Sounets è quatourzis (1902)
 Case! (1909)
 Les Pregàries e las Gràcies (1926)
 Lou Bent qui passe (1958)

Lexicography
 Dictionnaire du Gascon et béarnais modernes

Ethnography
 Autour de la table béarnaise (1932)
 La cuisine du pays (1936)
 Cansous entàus maynàdyes sus lous àyres (1900)
 Cansous trufanderes (1924)
 Chants de Béarn et de Gascogne (1951), in collaboration J.Poueigh

References

1874 births
1965 deaths
Occitan-language writers
French male writers